Review of Public Personnel Administration is a peer-reviewed academic journal that publishes papers in the field of public administration. The journal's editor are Jessica Sowa (University of Baltimore) and Christine Ledvinka Rush (Mississippi State University). It has been in publication since 1980 and is currently published by SAGE Publications.

Scope 
Review of Public Personnel Administration publishes scholarship on human resource management in public service organizations. The journal contains articles covering both traditional and emerging topics, including analysis of the effects of specific HR procedures or programs on the management function and assessment of the impact of HR management.

Abstracting and indexing 
Review of Public Personnel Administration  is abstracted and indexed in, among other databases:  SCOPUS, and the Social Sciences Citation Index. According to the Journal Citation Reports, its 2017 impact factor is 2.444, ranking it 14 out of 47 journals in the category ‘Public Administration’.

References

External links 
 

SAGE Publishing academic journals
English-language journals
Public administration journals
Publications established in 1980
Quarterly journals